Necturus is a genus of aquatic salamanders native to the eastern United States and Canada. They are commonly known as waterdogs and mudpuppies. The common mudpuppy (N. maculosus) is probably the best-known species – as an amphibian with gill slits, it is often dissected in comparative anatomy classes.

Taxonomy 
The genus is under scrutiny by herpetologists. The relationship between the species is still being studied. In 1991 Collins elevated N. maculosus louisianensis to full species status, usually considered a subspecies of the common mudpuppy (N. maculosus), but his interpretation was not largely followed. However, a 2018 study confirmed it as a distinct species, with Amphibian Species of the World following these results, although other authorities do not.

Species
There are seven to eight species:

Two known fossil species, N. krausei and an unnamed species, are respectively known from the Paleocene of Saskatchewan and from Florida during the Pleistocene.

Description
Necturus are paedomorphic: adults retain larval-like morphology with external gills, two pairs of gill slits, and no eyelids. They are moderately robust and have two pairs of short but well-developed limbs and a large, laterally compressed tail. Lungs are present but small.

Ecology
Necturus occur in surface waters, preferentially with clear water and rocky substrates without silt. They forage during the night and eat a variety of prey, but have preference for crayfish.

References

External links

Proteidae
Amphibian genera
Extant Paleocene first appearances
Taxa named by Constantine Samuel Rafinesque